Flåbygd is a village in Nome, Telemark, Norway. The local production is centered on agriculture.

Villages in Vestfold og Telemark
Flåbygd